Organizing or organized may refer to:

 Organizing (management), a process of coordinating task goals and activities to resources
 Community organizing, in which communities come together to act in their shared self-interest
 Professional organizing, an industry build around creating organizational systems for individuals and businesses
 Union organizing, the process of establishing trade unions
 Organizing Institute, a unit within the Organizing and Field Services Department of the American Federation of Labor and Congress of Industrial Organizations (AFL-CIO)
 Organizing model, a broad conception of organizations such as trade unions
 Organizing principle, a core assumption from which everything else by proximity can derive a classification or a value
 Organizing vision, a term developed by E. Burton Swanson and Neil Ramiller that defines how a vision is formed, a vision of how to organize structures and processes in regard to an information systems innovation
 Organized (album), a 2000 album by Morgan Nicholls
 Sorting, any process of arranging items systematically

See also 
 Organization (disambiguation) 
 Organizer (disambiguation)